Kalateh-ye Abd ol Samad (also Romanized as Kalāteh-ye ‘Abd ol Şamad and Kalāteh-ye ‘Abd oş Şamad; also known as Ḩājjīābād Mollā Qāsem and Kalāteh-ye Ḩājjī Ākhūnd) is a village in Harirud Rural District, Bujgan District, Torbat-e Jam County, Razavi Khorasan Province, Iran. At the 2006 census, its population was 267, in 59 families.

References 

Populated places in Torbat-e Jam County